Hambegamuwa Grama Niladhari Division is a Grama Niladhari Division of the Thanamalvila Divisional Secretariat, of Moneragala District, of Uva Province, Sri Lanka.

Demographics

Ethnicity

Religion

References 

Western Province, Sri Lanka